Omocestus panteli, or Pantel's grasshopper, is a species of slant-faced grasshopper in the family Acrididae. It is found on the Iberian Peninsula.

The IUCN conservation status of Omocestus panteli is "LC", least concern, with no immediate threat to the species' survival. The IUCN status was assessed in 2015. Their genetics have still been impacted by the Last Glacial Maximum, with three genetically distinct clusters in northwestern, central-southern, and northeastern Iberia.

References

Further reading

External links

 

panteli
Insects described in 1887
Orthoptera of Europe